Charles F. Mills  (September 1844 – April 9, 1874) was a Major League Baseball catcher. He played for the New York Mutuals in 1871 and 1872, appearing in 38 games and hitting .226. He died on April 9, 1874 in Brooklyn, New York.

External links

Major League Baseball catchers
Brooklyn Eckfords (NABBP) players
Brooklyn Atlantics (NABBP) players
New York Mutuals (NABBP) players
New York Mutuals players
Sportspeople from Brooklyn
Baseball players from New York City
Burials at Cypress Hills Cemetery
19th-century baseball players
1844 births
Date of birth missing
1874 deaths
Baseball players from New York (state)
19th-century deaths from tuberculosis
Tuberculosis deaths in New York (state)